Sigma-Aldrich (formally MilliporeSigma) is a chemical, life science, and biotechnology company owned by the German chemical conglomerate Merck Group.

Sigma-Aldrich was created in 1975 by the merger of Sigma Chemical Company and Aldrich Chemical Company. It grew through various acquisitions until it had over 9,600 employees and was listed on the Fortune 1000. The company is headquartered in St. Louis and has operations in approximately 40 countries.

In 2015, the German chemical conglomerate Merck Group acquired Sigma-Aldrich for $17 billion. The company is currently a part of Merck's life science business and in combination with Merck's earlier acquired Millipore, operates as MilliporeSigma.

History

Sigma Chemical Company of St. Louis and Aldrich Chemical Company of Milwaukee were both American specialty chemical companies when they merged in August 1975. The company grew throughout the 1980s and 1990s, with significant expansion in facilities, acquisitions and diversification into new market sectors.

Early history
 1935 – Midwest Consultants was founded in St Louis by brothers Aaron and Bernard Fischer, who hired chemical engineer Daniel Broida. 
 1946 – Sigma was formed from Midwest Consultants and manufactured just adenosine triphosphate. They were the first to manufacture pure ATP.
 1972 – Sigma's IPO
 1951 – Aldrich founded in Milwaukee by Alfred Bader and Jack Eisendrath and manufactured just 1-methyl-3-nitro-1-nitrosoguanidine.
 1966 – Aldrich's IPO
 1972 – Subsidiary Aldrich-Boranes launched to manufacture hydroboration products 
 1975 – Merger of Sigma Chemical and Aldrich Chemical to created Sigma-Aldrich. Their first year earned $43 million in sales.
 1999 – Sigma-Aldrich reaches $1 billion in sales
 2005 –  Announced membership in The RNAi Consortium
 2014 – Merck KGaA announced that it would purchase Sigma-Aldrich for approx. $17 billion (€13.1 billion).
 November 3, 2014 – Sigma-Aldrich filed a definitive proxy statement with the U.S. Securities and Exchange Commission to hold a special investors meeting regarding approval for the sale to Merck KGaA.

Acquisitions

1970s 
1978 – Makor Chemicals

1980s 
 1984 – Pathfinder
 1986 – Bio Yeda, Bristol Organics
 1989 – Fluka Chemie AG (Swiss company founded in the 1950s) purchased for $39 million.

1990s 
 1993 – Supelco, Inc. acquired to enter the chromatography market
 1994 – LabKemi AB
 1997 – Research Biochemicals International, Riedel-de-Haen, Techcares Systems, Carbolabs, YA Kemia
 1998 – Genosys

2000s 
 2000 – First Medical Inc., Amelung GmbH, ARK Scientific
 2001 – ISOTEC (produces stable isotopes used in basic research and medical diagnostics)
 2004 – Ultrafine (a supplier of contract manufacturing services for drug development), Tetrionics (a producer of high potency and cytotoxic active pharmaceutical ingredients)
 2005 – JRH Biosciences, an industrial supplier of cell culture products for the pharmaceutical and biotechnology industries; Proligo Group, a global supplier of genomics research tools
 2006 – Beijing Superior Chemicals, Iropharm, Pharmorphix, Advanced Separation Technologies (manufacturer of products for chiral chromatography)
 2007 – Epichem acquired to expand capabilities in materials sciences and semiconductor markets; Molecular Medicine BioServices acquired to provide large-scale viral manufacturing capabilities; announced alliance with Sangamo BioSciences to develop zinc finger-based laboratory research reagents
 2009 – ChemNavigator
 2010 – Cerilliant Corporation, ACE Animals
 2011 – Resource Technology Corp, Vetec Quimica Fina
 2012 – Research Organics Inc., BioReliance (a toxicology and veterinary diagnostics company); BioReliance had previously been acquired by Invitrogen and subsequently sold to Avista Capital Partners.
 2014 – Cell Marque
2015 – Combined with EMD Millipore to make MilliporeSigma.

Key numbers
Key numbers for Sigma-Aldrich.

Revenues:
 $2.79 billion (2014)

Products:
 100,000 chemical products (46,000 manufactured)
 30,000 laboratory equipment products

Customers:
 Approximately one million individual customers worldwide
 88,000 accounts

Geographies (% of 2008 sales):
 United States 35%
 Europe 43%
 Canada, Asia Pacific, Latin America 22%

Subsidiaries

Aldrich is a supplier in the research and fine chemicals market. Aldrich provides organic and inorganic chemicals, building blocks, reagents, advanced materials and stable isotopes for chemical synthesis, medicinal chemistry and materials science. Aldrich's chemicals catalog, the "Aldrich Catalog and Handbook" is often used as a handbook due to the inclusion of structures, physical data, and literature references.

Sigma is the Sigma-Aldrich's main biochemical supplier, with offerings including antibiotics, buffers, carbohydrates, enzymes, forensic tools, hematology and histology, nucleotides, proteins, peptides, amino acids and their derivatives.

Sigma RBI produces specialized products for use in the field of cell signaling and neuroscience. Their offerings range from standard biochemical reagents to specialized research tools, including ligands for receptors and ion channels, enzyme inhibitors, phosphospecific antibodies, key signal transduction enzymes, and assay kits for cell signaling.

ISOTEC provides isotopically labeled products for protein structure determination, peptide synthesis, proteomics, metabolic research, magnetic resonance imaging, nuclear magnetic resonance, breath test substrates, agriculture, as well as gas and gas mixes.

Riedel-de Haën was incorporated with Sigma-Aldrich in 1999 and manufactures reagents and standards.

Supelco is the chromatography products branch of Sigma-Aldrich. It provides chromatography columns and related tools for environmental, government, food and beverage, pharmaceutical, biotechnology, medical and chemical laboratories; sample preparation products and chemical reference standards.

Sigma-Aldrich Fine Chemicals (SAFC) is the fine chemical supply branch of Sigma-Aldrich specializing in raw materials for cell culture products; customized services for raw materials, manufacturing of active pharmaceutical ingredients.

Sigma Life Science provides products such as custom DNA/RNA oligos; custom DNA and LNA probes; siRNA; isotopically-labelled peptides and peptide libraries.

Sigma Advanced Genetic Engineering (SAGE) Labs is a division within Sigma-Aldrich that specializes in genetic manipulation of in vivo systems for special research and development applications. It was formed in 2008 to investigate zinc finger nuclease technology and its application for disease research models. Located in St. Louis, Missouri, SAGE Labs have developed knockout rats for the study of human diseases and disorders (such as autism), which are sold for up to US$95,000. SAGE also announced its first successful effort in creating a "knockout rabbit". Its facilities include a specific pathogen free, biosecure vivarium as well as research and development labs.

Carbolabs produces research quantities of chemicals produced by phosgenation reactions.  The company was acquired in 1998.

BioReliance provides testing and manufacturing services to pharmaceutical and biopharmaceutical companies that span the product cycle from early pre-clinical development to licensed production.
The company was acquired by Sigma Aldrich in January 2012.

Current leadership
Matthias Heinzel became CEO of the Life Science business of Merck KGaA, Darmstadt, Germany in April 2021 following Udit Batra's departure from company.

References

External links

Official website
Comunidad Oficial Facebook LATAM - Merck Life Science
Comunidad Linkedin LATAM - Merck Life Science

Companies formerly listed on the Nasdaq
Research support companies
Chemical companies of the United States
Companies based in St. Louis
Biotechnology companies of the United States
Chemical companies established in 1975
Biotechnology companies established in 1975
2015 mergers and acquisitions
Merck Group
American subsidiaries of foreign companies